Elcot may refer to:

 Elcot, Berkshire, a hamlet in England
 Electronics Corporation of Tamil Nadu